VMware Workstation Pro (known as VMware Workstation until release of VMware Workstation 12 in 2015) is a hosted (Type 2) hypervisor that runs on x64 versions of Windows and Linux operating systems (an x86-32 version of earlier releases was available); it enables users to set up virtual machines (VMs) on a single physical machine and use them simultaneously along with the host machine. Each virtual machine can execute its own operating system, including versions of Microsoft Windows, Linux, BSD, and MS-DOS. VMware Workstation is developed and sold by VMware, Inc. There is a free-of-charge version, VMware Workstation Player (known as VMware Player until release of VMware Workstation 12 in 2015), for non-commercial use. An operating systems license is needed to use proprietary ones such as Windows. Ready-made Linux VMs set up for different purposes are available from several sources.

VMware Workstation supports bridging existing host network adapters and sharing physical disk drives and USB devices with a virtual machine. It can simulate disk drives; an ISO image file can be mounted as a virtual optical disc drive, and virtual hard disk drives are implemented as .vmdk files.

VMware Workstation Pro can save the state of a virtual machine (a "snapshot") at any instant. These snapshots can later be restored, effectively returning the virtual machine to the saved state, as it was and free from any post-snapshot damage to the VM.

VMware Workstation includes the ability to group multiple virtual machines in an inventory folder. The machines in such a folder can then be powered on and powered off as a single object, useful for testing complex client-server environments.

2016 company changes and future development
VMware Workstation versions 12.0.0, 12.0.1, and 12.1.0 were released at intervals of about two months in 2015. In January 2016 the entire development team behind VMware Workstation and Fusion was disbanded and all US developers were immediately fired. The company said that "the restructuring activities will not impact the existence of any current product lines", that "roles and responsibilities associated with particular businesses will be moved to other regions and office locations", and that investment would continue "with emphasis on our growth products". The future of Workstation and Fusion became uncertain. On 24 April 2016 maintenance release 12.1.1 was released. In September, same year, the company announced that "we’re very much alive and well". Consequently, on September 13 Workstation 12.5 and Fusion 8.5 were released as free upgrades which added support for Windows 10 Anniversary edition and Windows Server 2016. Since then versions 14 (in 2017, skipping number 13), 15 (in 2018) and 16 (in 2020) were released.

Version history

Host OS support

Variants
There was a free VMware Player distinct from Workstation, with similar but reduced functionality, until VMware Player v7, Workstation v11. In 2015 the two packages were combined as VMware Workstation 12, with a free VMware Workstation Player version which, on purchase of a player license key granted commercial use. However, purchase of a pro license key became the higher specification VMware Workstation Pro. VMware Workstation Player, like VMware Player before it, is free of charge for non-commercial use, or for distribution or other use by written agreement. Workstation Pro is also available for download for a 30 day free trial period, and is easily confused with Workstation Player, which is an unlimited-time restricted-functionality version.
 VMware Workstation Player (formerly known as Player Pro), free for non-commercial use; a license may be purchased for commercial use, also providing eligibility for paid support.
 VMware Workstation Pro, available for a 30-day free trial before purchase but distinct from the permanently free version.

The features of the versions are compared on the VMware web site.

VMware Tools
VMware Tools, a package with drivers and other software available for the various guest operating systems VMware products support, installs in guest operating systems to add functionality. Tools is updated from time to time, with v12.1.5 in 29 November 2022. It has several components, including the following:
 Drivers for emulated hardware:
 VESA-compliant graphics for the guest machine to access high screen resolutions and/or special window effects such as Windows Aero/Desktop Window Manager
 Network drivers for the vmxnet2 and vmxnet3 NIC
 Ensoniq AudioPCI audio
 Mouse integration
 Support of shared folders and drag-and-drop file transfer between host and guest. This functionality is described as HGFS (Host Guest File System), and may be disabled by default for security; it may be enabled by changes to the .VMX configuration file
 Clipboard sharing between host and guest
 Time-synchronization capabilities (guest synchronizes with host machine's clock)
 Support for Unity, a feature that allows seamless integration of applications with the host desktop by hiding the monitor of the Virtual Machine and drawing the windows of applications running in the virtual machine on the host. Unity support was added for Windows 10 and removed for Linux in Workstation 12.

Third-party resources

Ready-to-use virtual machines
Many ready-made virtual machines (VMs) which run on VMware Workstation Player, VMware Workstation Pro, and other virtualization software are available for specific purposes, either for purchase or free of charge; for example free Linux-based "browser appliances" with the Firefox or other browser installed which can be used for safe Web browsing; if infected or damaged it can be discarded and replaced by a clean copy. The appliance can be configured to automatically reset itself after each use so personal information and other changes are not stored. VMs distributed legally only have freely distributable operating systems, as operating systems on VMs must be licensed; ready-to-use Microsoft Windows VMs, in particular, are not distributed, except for evaluation versions.

Other tools
 PowerWF - Provides a visual representation of VMware VIX scripts, converting them into workflows, or converting workflows into Powershell cmdlets and modules. VIX is VMware's addition to Microsoft's Powershell for automation of the VMware Player.

See also
 Comparison of platform virtualization software
 OS-level virtualization
 VirtualBox
 VMware Fusion
 VMware Workstation Player
 x86 virtualization

References

External links
 
 VMware Workstation product page
 VMware Lifecycle Product Matrix
 VMware Workstation Free 

Workstation
Virtualization software
Windows software
Proprietary cross-platform software
1998 software